The Bank of Edwardsville is a traditional American bank founded in 1868 and located in Edwardsville, Illinois.
 It was acquired by First Busey Corporation, the holding company of Busey Bank, in early 2019.

The clients' deposits are insured by FDIC and they can use 19 bank offices located in Alton, Belleville, Bethalto, Collinsville, Glen Carbon, Granite City, Swansea, St. Louis, etc.

The services include:

personal savings and checking accounts
money market accounts
Christmas Club accounts
consumer loans, etc.

References

External links 
Homepage

Banks based in Illinois
Banks established in 1868
1868 establishments in Illinois